Caulotops is a genus of plant bugs in the family Miridae. There are about eight described species in Caulotops.

Species
These eight species belong to the genus Caulotops:
 Caulotops agavis Reuter, 1909
 Caulotops barberi Knight, 1926
 Caulotops cyaneipennis Reuter, 1908
 Caulotops distanti (Reuter, 1905)
 Caulotops nigrus Carvalho, 1985
 Caulotops platensis (Berg, 1883)
 Caulotops puncticollis Bergroth, 1898
 Caulotops tibiopallidus Carvalho, 1985

References

Further reading

 
 
 

Miridae genera
Articles created by Qbugbot
Eccritotarsini